Mary Townley may refer to:

 Mary Townley (architect) (1753–1839), English architect
 Mary Katherine Campbell (1905–1990), only person to win the Miss America pageant twice, married Frederick Townley
 Mary Boggs (1920–2002), American muralist and textbook author who published under the name Mary Ross Townley